James Heaton Baker was a Republican politician who was Ohio Secretary of State from 1856 to 1858, Minnesota Secretary of State, 1860–1862, and served in the American Civil War.

Life 
James H. Baker was born May 6, 1829, in Monroe, Butler County, Ohio. He was educated in common schools, and graduated from Ohio Wesleyan University. He became a teacher, and had charge of the Female Seminary at Richmond, Indiana. In 1853 he purchased the Scioto Gazette in Chillicothe, Ohio. In 1855 he was elected to a single term as Ohio Secretary of State. Later in life, he would be Minnesota Secretary of State 1860–1862.

During the American Civil War, Baker served as colonel of the 10th Minnesota Volunteer Infantry in the Union Army in 1862–1863. He was appointed Provost Marshal for the Department of Missouri, and served till the close of the war. He was mustered out of the volunteers on October 21, 1865. In recognition of Baker's service, on January 13, 1866, President Andrew Johnson nominated Baker for appointment to the grade of brevet brigadier general to rank from March 13, 1865, and the U.S. Senate confirmed the appointment on March 12, 1866.

After the war, Baker was appointed Register of Public Lands at the Boonville, Missouri Federal Land Office, which he performed for two years. He then retired to a farm in Minnesota, and was appointed Commissioner of Pensions by President Grant from 1871 to 1875.

Together with Judge Lorin Cray, Baker paid for the creation of a four-ton granite marker known as the "Hanging Monument", commemorating the mass execution of 38 Dakota men in Mankato on December 26, 1862.  Erected in 1912, it soon became the object of controversy and was finally removed by the City of Mankato in 1971.

Baker died at Mankato, Minnesota, May 25, 1913. He is buried at Glenwood Cemetery in Mankato.

Publications

Notes

References

External links

James Heaton Baker at FamilySearch.org

Secretaries of State of Ohio
Secretaries of State of Minnesota
Ohio Republicans
People from Monroe, Ohio
People from Chillicothe, Ohio
People of Minnesota in the American Civil War
Union Army generals
1829 births
Ohio Wesleyan University alumni
1913 deaths
19th-century American newspaper publishers (people)
Politicians from Mankato, Minnesota
19th-century American politicians
Journalists from Ohio